Hydroptila apalachicola is a species of microcaddisfly. It is only known from three adult males collected from cold spring-fed streams in the Apalachicola National Forest, Florida. This is a tiny brown caddisfly up to 3.2 mm in length and can only be distinguished from its closest relatives by minute differences in the structure of the tenth abdominal tergum.

References
New species of microcaddisflies from Florida

Hydroptilidae
Insects described in 1998
Insects of the United States